Eilenberg is a surname, and may refer to:

 Samuel Eilenberg (1913–1998), Polish mathematician
 Richard Eilenberg (1848–1927), German composer

Named after Samuel
 Eilenberg–MacLane space
 Eilenberg–Moore algebra
 Eilenberg–Steenrod axioms
 Eilenberg machine

See also
 Eilenburg
 Eulenberg (disambiguation)